In functional analysis, a topological homomorphism or simply homomorphism (if no confusion will arise) is the analog of homomorphisms for the category of topological vector spaces (TVSs). 
This concept is of considerable importance in functional analysis and the famous open mapping theorem gives a sufficient condition for a continuous linear map between Fréchet spaces to be a topological homomorphism.

Definitions 

This concept is of considerable importance in functional analysis and the famous open mapping theorem gives a sufficient condition for a continuous linear map between Fréchet spaces to be a topological homomorphism. 

A TVS embedding or a topological monomorphism is an injective topological homomorphism. Equivalently, a TVS-embedding is a linear map that is also a topological embedding.

Characterizations 

Suppose that  is a linear map between TVSs and note that  can be decomposed into the composition of the following canonical linear maps: 

The following are equivalent:
 is a topological homomorphism
the induced map  is an isomorphism of TVSs

 is a topological homomorphism
 is continuous
 is continuous at the origin
 is closed in

Sufficient conditions

Open mapping theorem 

The open mapping theorem, also known as Banach's homomorphism theorem, gives a sufficient condition for a continuous linear operator between complete metrizable TVSs to be a topological homomorphism.

Examples 

Every continuous linear functional on a TVS is a topological homomorphism.

Let  be a -dimensional TVS over the field  and let  be non-zero. Let  be defined by  If  has it usual Euclidean topology and if  is Hausdorff then  is a TVS-isomorphism.

See also

References

Bibliography 

  
  
  
  
  
  
  
  
  
  
  
  
  
  
  

Functional analysis